The Medlicott Medal for Service to History is awarded annually by the Historical Association. The award is named for William Norton Medlicott, and was first made in 1985. Twenty-seven men have won the award, and nine women.

Winners
2020 Rana Mitter
2019 Janet L. Nelson
2018 Justin Champion
2017 Mary Beard
2016 Antony Beevor
2015 Margaret MacMillan
2014 Richard J. Evans
2013 David Cannadine
2012 Bettany Hughes
2011 Michael Wood
2010 Peter Hennessy
2009 Melvyn Bragg
2008 Gordon Batho
2007 Chris Culpin
2006 Lisa Jardine
2005 Martin Gilbert
2004 Ian Kershaw
2003 Keith Thomas
2002 Simon Schama
2001 David Starkey   (Award withdrawn July 2020)
2000 Antonia Fraser
1999 Eric Hobsbawm
1998 Patrick Collinson
1997 Roy Jenkins
1996 Irene Collins
1995 John West
1994 R. R. Davies
1993 Marjorie Reeves
1992 Lord Bullock
1991 Neil Cossons
1990 John Fines
1989 Magnus Magnusson
1988 Ragnhild Hatton
1987 Frederick George Emmison
1986 H. R. Loyn
1985 A. G. Dickens

Notes

Humanities awards
Awards established in 1985
1985 establishments in the United Kingdom